James Aspnes is a professor in Computer Science at Yale University. He earned his Ph.D. in computer science from Carnegie Mellon University in 1992. His main research interest is distributed algorithms.

In 1989, he wrote and operated TinyMUD, one of the first "social" MUDs that allowed players to build a shared virtual world.

He is the son of David E. Aspnes, Distinguished University Professor at North Carolina State University.

Awards
 Dijkstra Prize, 2020.
 Dylan Hixon '88 Prize for Teaching Excellence in the Natural Sciences, Yale College, 2000.
 IBM Graduate Fellowship, 1991–1992.
 NSF Graduate Fellowship, 1987–1990.
 Phi Beta Kappa, 1987.

References

External links
 James Aspnes's Home Page at Yale

Year of birth missing (living people)
MUD developers
Living people
Carnegie Mellon University alumni
Yale University faculty